Božidar Smiljanić (20 September 1936 – 7 April 2018) was a Yugoslav-Croatian actor. He appeared in more than 70 films from 1953 to 2018.

His son is popular actor Mitja Smiljanić.

Filmography

References

External links 

1936 births
2018 deaths
Male actors from Zagreb
Croatian male film actors